Nandini (born Kavitha; 30 December 1979), commonly known as Kausalya, is an Indian actress and model, who has starred mainly in South Indian cinema. She is known as Nandini in Malayalam film Industry.  After starting her career as a lead heroine, she has since gone on to portray supporting roles.

Career
Nandini was pursuing a modelling career, before she debuted in the 1996 Malayalam film April 19 by Balachandra Menon. The following year, she appeared in her first Tamil film Kaalamellam Kadhal Vaazhga (1997) with Murali and went on to star in several successful films in Tamil like Nerukku Ner (1997), Priyamudan (1998), Sollamale (1998), Pooveli (1998), Vaanathaippola (2000) and Kutty (2001).

She went on to appear in many Malayalam films including Ayal Kadha Ezhuthukayanu (1998),
Karumadikkuttan (2001), Sundara Purushan (2001), Shivam (2002), Udayam (2004), Vajram (2004), Maanikyan (2004) and Sooryan (2007).

She had starred in over 30 films in Tamil and Malayalam, while securing a Filmfare Award for Best Actress – Tamil for her performance in Pooveli. She mostly acted in saree-clad and conservative roles.  By the mid-2000s, she turned character artiste and went on to portray supporting roles in films such as Thirumalai (2003) and Santosh Subramaniam (2008) and ventured into television with the series Manaivi which aired 436 episodes on Sun TV.

In 2004, she attempted to make a comeback as a lead actress but unfortunately several of her projects became delayed. Films such as Thiagarajan's Police which starred her alongside Prashanth, Manadhil with Karthik, Vendumadi Nee Enakku and Rosappoo Chinna Rosappoo with Sathyaraj, were readied but then stalled in quick succession.

Kausalya returned to the Tamil industry after 6 years with the action film, Poojai (2014).

Personal life
Kausalya was born in Bangalore, Karnataka state. Her father Shivashankar Siddalingappa, a Bangalorean, worked as a depot manager at Karnataka State Road Transport Corporation. Her mother is half Marathi and half Kannada, and was born and brought up in Sri Lanka. Her grandmother was from Sri Lanka.

Awards 
Filmfare Award South
 1998 - Filmfare Award for Best Actress – Tamil - Pooveli

Filmography

Film

Television

Music video

Web series

References

External links
 
 
 

Actresses in Tamil cinema
Actresses in Malayalam cinema
Actresses in Kannada cinema
20th-century Indian actresses
21st-century Indian actresses
Actresses in Telugu cinema
Indian film actresses
Indian television actresses
Actresses in Malayalam television
Actresses in Tamil television
Actresses in Kannada television
Living people
Kannada actresses
Actresses from Bangalore
1979 births
Filmfare Awards South winners